Hunminjeongeum Haerye (Hanja: 訓民正音解例; literally: "Explanations and Examples of the Correct/Proper Sounds for the Instruction of the People"), or simply Haerye, is a commentary on the Hunminjeongeum, the original promulgation of hangul. The Hunminjeongeum Haeryebon (訓民正音解例本) is the printed edition—bon (本) means "book" or "edition".

It was written by scholars from the Jiphyeonjeon (Hall of Worthies), commissioned by King Sejong the Great. In addition to an introduction by Sejong (excerpted from the beginning of Hunminjeongeum) and a colophon by the scholar Jeong Inji (鄭麟趾), it contains the following chapters:

 "An Explanation of the Design of the Letters" (制字解)
 "An Explanation of the Initials" (初聲解)
 "An Explanation of the Medials" (中聲解)
 "An Explanation of the Finals" (終聲解)
 "An Explanation of the Combination of the Letters" (合字解)
 "Examples of the Uses of the Letters" (用字例)

See Hangul letter design for an excerpt of the letter design explanations from chapters 2 through 4.

The original publication is 65 pages printed in hanja with right-to-left vertical writing as is the case for all the ancient Korean literature in regular script, except where Hangul are mentioned and illustrated. One original copy was made public in 1940 by Jeon Hyeongpil, an antique collector who acquired it from Lee Hangeol (1880–1950), whose family had possessed it for generations.

Another copy was reported to be found in 2008. It included detailed footnotes by scholars at the time. 

Now kept in the Kansong Art Museum (간송 미술관; 澗松美術館), it is South Korean National Treasure No. 70 and has been a UNESCO Memory of the World Register since October 1997.

See also
 ʼPhags-pa script: Gari Ledyard, Sejong Professor of Korean History Emeritus at Columbia University, traces five consonants credited in the manuscript to the Gu Seal Script of the Mongol Yuan dynasty to similar-sounding Indoeuropean consonants linking the Greek, Latin and Syriac alphabets of the West to the 'Phags-pa/Tibetan scripts of the East

References

External links 
 Entire publication typed up in hanja and translation in Japanese
 Entire document scanned: translation available in German
 Record in UNESCO Memory of the World Register

Joseon dynasty works
Korean language
Korean culture
Hangul